Morgan Lake (born 12 May 1997) is a British high jumper. She was the 2014 World Junior champion in heptathlon and high jump, and the 2015 European Junior champion. Lake holds British indoor record.

She broke the 29-year-old UK Under-17 high jump record, clearing 1.90 m in 2013, and broke the 23-year-old UK U20 high jump record with 1.93m in 2014. She also broke the world indoor pentathlon U18 record in 2014, with a score of 4284 points. At the 2016 Olympic Games in Rio, Lake became the first British woman to reach an Olympic high jump final since Debbie Marti in 1992. In 2018, she finished fourth at the World Indoor Championships and won her first senior (silver) medal at the Commonwealth Games. She is multiple British national champion.

Athletics career
Born in Reading, Berkshire, England, Lake began to compete competitively as an under-13 in 2008 at Slough Juniors Athletics Club. In 2009, she broke the UK under-13 pentathlon record with 3,046 points. In 2011, she broke the under-15 record with 3,755 points. At the English Schools Championships, she won the pentathlon and long jump in 2010 (under-15) and the long jump in 2012 (under-17). In 2013, she finished second at the British Indoor Championships in the high jump.

Coaching
Lake competes for Windsor, Slough, Eton and Hounslow Athletic Club and is coached by her father Eldon Lake. She also receives specialist coaching from Jeremy Tigar in the throw disciplines (shot put and javelin), Richard Aspden in the high jump and Ian Grant in the hurdles.

2013
At the 2013 World Youth Championships in Donetsk, Lake led after day one of the heptathlon by 192 points. The day included a UK Under 17 record of 1.90 m in the high jump, a height that would have been good enough to win the individual high jump event. The previous record of 1.89 by Debbie Marti, had stood for 29 years. However, on day two she could only manage 4.63 metres in the long jump, followed by two fouls. Then in the javelin, she could only throw 30.81 metres. These performances saw her drop down to sixth and she withdrew from the competition before the final event, the 800 metres.

2014
In February 2014, Lake competed in an indoor athletics event in Vaxjo, Sweden, where she broke the World Youth (U18) Record for the pentathlon, improving Carolina Klüft's score of 4261, with 4284 points.

On 2 and 3 May 2014, Lake won the prestigious Multistars international event in her debut at the senior heptathlon. Still 9 days short of her 17th birthday, she became by four years the youngest champion in the 27-year history of the event. Her score of 5896 points exceeded by 780 points the performance (5116 points) achieved by Olympic champion Jessica Ennis-Hill at the age of 17 when placing 13th in the same event in 2003. Lake's performance also exceeded by 415 points the previous UK Youth record for the heptathlon (5481 points), set in 2009 by Katarina Johnson-Thompson.

On 18 May, she broke the 23-year-old UK junior high jump record with a clearance of 1.93 m in Loughborough. The previous record of 1.91 m was set by Lea Haggett in 1991 and was equalled in 1997 by Susan Jones.

On 31 May and 1 June 2014 Lake competed in the Hypo Meeting, generally considered the premier multi-events meeting in the annual athletics calendar. She achieved 17th place, improving her lifetime best score and UK Youth record by 185 points to a total of 6081 points. This performance also ranked her second on the UK all-time Under 20 list, behind Katarina Johnson-Thompson, and improved by 90 points the European Youth record of 5991 points achieved in 2005 by Tatyana Chernova of Russia, the 2011 World Champion at heptathlon. Lake's individual performances in Götzis included three new personal bests in the shot put, a personal best in the 200 metres and two personal bests in the javelin throw.

In July 2014, Lake and her coaches initially planned to have her compete in the 2014 Commonwealth Games in Glasgow, but decided against it and headed for the 2014 World Junior Championships in Eugene, Oregon instead. She began her campaign at the championships on 22 July with the 100 m hurdles, finishing fourth in the third heat and 12th overall with a time of 14.29 s. She stormed to the top of the heptathlon table with 2,096 points, setting a British junior record of 1.94 m in the heptathlon high jump. The only athlete to have cleared 1.85 m, she attempted a world youth record and British senior record height of 1.97 m, but failed to clear it. She began the afternoon session with a win in the heptathlon shot put, throwing 14.17 m to take her total to 2,901 points. She closed the day with the 200 m, finishing in third place both in the third heat and overall behind German world youth champion Celina Leffler and Dutch athlete Nadine Visser to end with a total of 3,821 points and remain at the top of the heptathlon table.

Lake started the second day relatively poorly, finishing fourth in the heptathlon long jump in with a distance of 5.90 m. However, her total rose to 4,640 points, still enough to keep her at the top of the heptathlon table and in pole position for the gold medal. She finished in sixth place at the heptathlon javelin throw the same morning with a personal best of 41.66 m, but remained on top of the overall table with an additional 699 points to her total. Lake then closed the day with a seventh-place finish in the 800 m with a personal best time of 2:21.06, but secured the gold medal with a final total of 6,148 points, ahead of Cuban Yorgelis Rodríguez and Visser, who went on to win bronze in the individual 100 m hurdles event on 28 July.

On 27 July, the final day of the championships, Lake competed in the individual high jump event, and took her second gold medal with a height of 1.93 m. She and silver medallist Michaela Hrubá of the Czech Republic were the only competitors to have managed to clear 1.91 m. Lake went on to make three attempts at 1.97 m as she did in the heptathlon high jump five days earlier, but again failed to set a new British senior record.

2016
On 18 August 2016, Lake competed in the Rio Olympics in the individual high jump event for Team GB, achieving a personal best of 1.94 m and reaching the final. In the finals, Lake successfully completed a height of 1.93 m coming joint 10th alongside Iryna Herashchenko and Inika McPherson.

2017
She jumped her personal best of 1.97 in Birmingham, the second best jump ever by a British female.

2018
Lake finished fourth at the 2018 IAAF World Indoor Championships, with a clearance of 1.93 metres, missing out on a medal on countback. A month later, she won a silver medal at the 2018 Commonwealth Games, with another clearance of 1.93 m.

2019
Lake was selected to represent Great Britain at the 2019 IAAF World Athletics Championships in Doha, Qatar. She competed in the high jump and was eliminated during qualification after failing at 1.89m.

2020
She became British champion for the fifth successive year when winning the high jump event at the 2020 British Athletics Championships with a jump of 1.80 metres. She also finished 2nd in the indoor competition with 1.84m.

2021
Lake once again won the British Championships with a leap of 1.93 m. At the 2020 Summer Olympics in Tokyo she qualified for the final with 1.95m but withdrew due to injury.

2022
She won the British title again, finished fourth in the Commonwealth Games and seventh at the European Championships.

2023
On 4 February, Lake broke the British indoor record with a jump of 1.99 m, an outright national best, at the specialist Hustopečské skákání meet in Hustopeče, Czechia.

National titles
 British Athletics Championships
 High jump: 2016, 2017, 2018, 2019, 2020, 2021, 2022
 British Indoor Athletics Championships
 High jump indoor: 2016, 2017, 2018, 2019

References

External links

 
 
 
 
 
 
 
 
 

1997 births
Living people
Sportspeople from Reading, Berkshire
Sportspeople from Berkshire
British heptathletes
English heptathletes
English high jumpers
British high jumpers
Olympic high jumpers
Olympic athletes of Great Britain
Athletes (track and field) at the 2016 Summer Olympics
English female high jumpers
British female high jumpers
Commonwealth Games silver medallists for England
Commonwealth Games medallists in athletics
Athletes (track and field) at the 2018 Commonwealth Games
World Athletics Championships athletes for Great Britain
People educated at Wellington College, Berkshire
Athletes (track and field) at the 2020 Summer Olympics
British Athletics Championships winners
Medallists at the 2018 Commonwealth Games